Thinking Allowed is a BBC Radio 4 series discussing social science.

Thinking Allowed may also refer to:

"Thinking Allowed?," the first single by British folk metal band Skyclad
Thinking Allowed: The Best of Prospect, 1995–2005, a collection of essays previously published in Prospect magazine

See also
Thinking Out Loud (disambiguation)